The Roman Catholic Diocese of Port-Gentil is a diocese located in the city of Port-Gentil in the Ecclesiastical province of Libreville in Gabon.

History
 19 March 2003: Established as the Diocese of Port-Gentil from the Metropolitan Archdiocese of Libreville

Bishops of Port-Gentil
 Mathieu Madega Lebouankehan (19 March 2003 - 19 January 2013); transferred to Mouila, also apostolic administrator of Port-Gentil
 Eusebius Chinekezi Ogbonna Managwu (12 January 2016 – present)

See also
Roman Catholicism in Gabon

References

External links
 GCatholic.org
 Catholic Hierarchy

Roman Catholic dioceses in Gabon
Christian organizations established in 2003
Roman Catholic dioceses and prelatures established in the 21st century
2003 establishments in Gabon
Roman Catholic Ecclesiastical Province of Libreville